The AN/CPS-1, also known as the Microwave Early Warning (MEW) radar, was a semi-mobile, S band, early-warning radar developed by the MIT Radiation Laboratory during World War II.  It was one of the first projects attempted by the Lab and was intended to build equipment to transition from the British long-wave radar to the new microwave centimeter-band radar made possible by the cavity magnetron. This project, led by Luis Walter Alvarez, became the world's first microwave phased-array antenna.

Deployed to the European Theater in 1944, the MEW proved to be an extremely effective radar against German V-1 flying bombs and V-2 rockets. After the war, the AN/CPS-1 was adopted for use by civil aviation becoming the first radar used to track aircraft on civil air routes in the United States.

Background
In 1940, Vannevar Bush, head of the National Defense Research Committee, established the "Microwave Committee" (section D-1) and the "Fire Control" division (D-2) to develop a more advanced radar anti-aircraft system in time to assist the British air-defense effort. In September of that year, a British delegation, the Tizard Mission, revealed to US and Canadian researchers that they had developed a magnetron oscillator operating at the top end of the UHF band (10 cm wavelength/3 GHz), allowing greatly increased accuracy. The magnetron, developed in 1940 by John Randall and Harry Boot at the University of Birmingham, provided a good power source and made microwave radars feasible. Bush organized the Radiation Laboratory (Rad Lab) at the Massachusetts Institute of Technology (MIT) to develop applications using it.

As one of the lab's first projects it was meant to replace older, longwave, early warning radars such as the SCR-270, SCR-527 and SCR-588 that were proving to be less effective as the Germans increased their radar jamming and deception.  In working on the Microwave Early Warning system (MEW), Luis Alvarez invented a linear dipole array antenna that not only suppressed the unwanted side lobes of the radiation field, but also could be electronically scanned without the need for mechanical scanning. This was the first microwave phased-array antenna, and Alvarez used it not only in MEW but in two additional radar systems. The antenna enabled the Eagle precision bombing radar to support precision bombing in bad weather or through clouds. It was completed rather late in the war; although a number of B-29s were equipped with Eagle and it worked well, it came too late to make much difference.

Development
The original idea for the MEW sprung from a discussion between Alvarez and famed Welsh physicist Taffy Bowen on November 19, 1941, that centered on developing a better radar for bombing. Alvarez's initial idea involved placing a twenty-foot antenna on an aircraft's wings that utilized a waveguide with slots cut into it to create narrow. high-resolution beams.  This idea became the catalyst for the ground-based MEW.

In the summer of 1943, a set was rushed into production to allow the United States Army Signal Corps to begin testing at the Army Air Force School of Applied Tactics at the Orlando Army Air Base in Florida.  At the same time, an office was established at Camp Evans, New Jersey in order to oversee the project.

When design was complete and it was finally ready for full-scale production, the radar weighed more than 65 tons and required eight trucks, 150 men and three days to move it.

Operational use

World War II
The first MEW was shipped to England in January 1944. Eventually five sets that were built by the Radiation Lab deployed overseas in 1944 while additional production of the radar began to ramp up. Initially the first radar was established at Devonshire to serve as a training site for crews operating the other newly delivered radars.  From its position, it could see across the English Channel into skies above Cotentin Peninsula and on the evening of June 5, 1944 its operators created a time-lapse film of the radar's plan position indicator creating a very unique view of the airspace during the Normandy landings. At the urging of Louis Ridenour the radar was moved in early July to Hastings to improve its ability to track buzz bombs. Six days after D-Day, a MEW came ashore at Omaha Beach to serve as a mobile ground-controlled interception station.  The radar proved very effective against low-flying German aircraft attempting to infiltrate behind Allied lines.

Post-War uses
MEWs were deployed to South Korea after the war.  In early 1948, American radar crews utilizing the MEW tracked Soviet Air Forces MIGs over North Korea.

See also
AN/CPS-5
List of radars

Notes

References
Bibliography

External links
 AN/CPS-1 @radartutorial.eu

External references

Military radars of the United States
World War II radars
AN CPS-1
Military equipment introduced from 1940 to 1944